Leading aircraftman (LAC) or leading aircraftwoman (LACW) is a junior rank in some air forces. It sits between aircraftman and senior aircraftman, and has a NATO rank code of OR-2. The rank badge is a horizontal two-bladed propeller. The rank was renamed air specialist (class 2) (AS2) in the Royal Air Force in July 2022.

History 
The rank originated in the Royal Air Force, when it was formed in 1918. It replaced the Royal Flying Corps rank of air mechanic 1st class (which wore the same badge). It was only a trade classification until 1 January 1951, when it became a rank, although it is non-supervisory.

Countries

Australia 
Leading aircraftman is also a rank in the Royal Australian Air Force (which uses a single chevron rather than a propeller device) where it is the senior aircraftman rank.

Bangladesh 
Bangladesh Air Force

Canada 
It was a rank until 1968 in the Royal Canadian Air Force being replaced by the army rank of private after unification, which then in 2015 was replaced by aviator (basic).

Ghana 
Ghana Air Force

India 
Indian Air Force

New Zealand 
In the Royal New Zealand Air Force, the rank is awarded after three years of service or completion of a senior trade course, whichever comes first.

Leading air cadet (LAC) in the New Zealand Air Training Corps also uses the propeller badge. It is not technically a rank (although many units regard it as a very junior NCO rank), and may be awarded to cadets who have attended a minimum of thirty parades, or completed one year in a unit. The rank is generally awarded to those cadets who show obvious leadership skill.

Sri Lanka 
Sri Lanka Air Force

Zimbabwe
Air Force of Zimbabwe.

See also 

 Aircraftman
 Airman

Footnotes

See also
RAF enlisted ranks

Military ranks of the Commonwealth
Military ranks of Australia
Former military ranks of Canada
Military ranks of the Royal Air Force
Air force ranks